Hickam Housing is a census-designated place comprising part of Joint Base Pearl Harbor–Hickam in the City & County of Honolulu, Hawaii, United States. The population was 7,581 at the 2020 census. The CDP occupies the area that was formerly Hickam Air Force Base.

A portion of Daniel K. Inouye International Airport is in the CDP.

Geography 
The Hickam Housing CDP is centered on  (21.3306, -157.9541). The community is located on Joint Base Pearl Harbor–Hickam, primarily occupying the land that was formerly part of Hickam Air Force Base, but also occupying a small portion of land that was formerly part of Naval Station Pearl Harbor. The CDP is bordered to the east by Honolulu International Airport, to the south by Mamala Bay, to the west by the entrance to Pearl Harbor, and to the north by additional land within Joint Base Pearl Harbor-Hickam.

Demographics

At the 2000 census, there were 5,471 people, 1,632 households, and 1,589 families residing at Hickam. The racial makeup of the town was 66.2% White, 11.7% Black, 0.6% Native American, 8.2% Asian, 1.0% Pacific Islander, 4.1% from other races, and 8.3% from two or more races.  8.4% of the population were Hispanic or Latino of any race.

In 2000, of the 1,632 households, 73.3% had children under the age of 18 living with them, 90.9% were married couples living together, 3.8% had a female householder with no husband present, and 2.6% were non-families. 2.5% of households were one person, and 0.0% were one person aged 65 or older.  The average household size was 3.35 and the average family size was 3.40.

On the base, the population was spread out, with 40.4% under the age of 18, 7.9% from 18 to 24, 45.5% from 25 to 44, 5.9% from 45 to 64, and 0.3% 65 or older.  The median age was 26 years.  For every 100 females, there were 102.3 males.  For every 100 females age 18 and over, there were 100.2 males.

The median household income was at Hickam was $42,298, and the median family income was $41,989.  Males had a median income of $30,588 versus $23,548 for females.  The per capita income for the CDP was $15,039;  2.2% of the population and 2.1% of families were below the poverty line.  Out of the total population, 2.6% of those under the age of 18 and 25.0% of those 65 and older were living below the poverty line.

Education
The Hawaii Department of Education operates public schools. Mokulele Elementary School is in the CDP.

The private Assets School has its K-8 campus in Hickam Housing CDP..

See also
Joint Base Pearl Harbor–Hickam

References

Census-designated places in Honolulu County, Hawaii
Populated places on Oahu
Populated coastal places in Hawaii